Jibantala Rokeya Mahavidyalaya, established in 2001, is an undergraduate college in Mallikati, Canning, West Bengal, India. This college is affiliated to the University of Calcutta.

Departments

Arts
Bengali
English
Sanskrit
History
Geography
Political Science
Philosophy
Education
Arbic

Accreditation
Jibantala Rokeya Mahavidyalaya is recognized by the University Grants Commission (UGC).

See also 
List of colleges affiliated to the University of Calcutta
Education in India
Education in West Bengal

References

External links
 

Educational institutions established in 2001
University of Calcutta affiliates
Universities and colleges in South 24 Parganas district
2001 establishments in West Bengal